Wilson Peak is a  mountain peak in the U.S. state of Colorado. It is located in the Lizard Head Wilderness of the Uncompahgre National Forest, in the northwestern San Juan Mountains. It is the highest point in San Miguel County. 

The mountain was named for A.D. Wilson, the chief topographer with the Hayden Survey. Nearby Mount Wilson also honors him. The original indigenous name for the mountain was Shandoka, which translates to "Storm Maker", a reference to the peak's effect on local weather patterns.

Geography
Wilson Peak is in the western part of the San Juan Mountains. The western San Juans are also known as the San Miguel Mountains or the Wilson Massif. Two additional fourteen thousand foot peaks are within  of its summit: Mount Wilson and El Diente Peak. Gladstone Peak is located on the ridge between Wilson Peak and Mount Wilson.

Recreation

Wilson Peak is climbed by hundreds each year, primarily in summer months, but winter ascents are not unusual and sometimes serve as the beginning of backcountry skiing descents. Summer ascents of the peak are considered Class 3 technical climbs, meaning that scrambling over rock is required (with hand holds being used for balance) and ropes typically not employed. 

In popular culture
The stately and classically mountainous profile of Wilson Peak as viewed from the East and North has led to its use as a symbol of rugged mountains in advertising. Wilson Peak features prominently in many television advertisements for Coors Brewing Company which is located in Golden, Colorado. The Jeep automobile corporation also often uses Wilson Peak as a backdrop in its television commercials, particularly in advertisements for its off-road models.

Because of its proximity to Telluride, Colorado, many local companies and festivals use images of Wilson Peak in the advertising to convey the beauty and mountainous nature of the area.

Wilson Peak is featured prominently in Quentin Tarantino's movie The Hateful Eight.

See also

List of mountain peaks of Colorado
List of Colorado county high points
List of Colorado fourteeners

References

External links

 
Traditional Route, with discussion of private land restrictions
Wilson Peak on Distantpeak.com
A gallery of photographs of Wilson Peak
Topographic map
Access and Preservation Project for Wilson Peak

San Juan Mountains (Colorado)
Mountains of San Miguel County, Colorado
Fourteeners of Colorado
Uncompahgre National Forest